In Greek mythology, Asterope (Ancient Greek: Ἀστεροπή or Στεροπή, Asteropē "lightning") may refer to the following characters:
 Asterope, one of the 3,000 Oceanids, water-nymph daughters of the Titans Oceanus and his sister-spouse Tethys. She was the mother of Acragas by Zeus.
 Asterope, a Hesperide.
 Asterope or Sterope, one of the Pleiades.
 Asterope, mother of Circe and possibly Aeetes by Helius, according to some.
 Asterope or Sterope, daughter of Cepheus, King of Tegea.
 Asterope or Hesperia, the wife or desired lover of Aesacus and daughter of Cebren.
 Asterope, the Boeotian mother of Peneleos by Hippalcimus.

Classical literature sources 

Chronological listing of classical literature sources for Asterope:

 Hesiod, The Astronomy (trans. Evelyn-White) (Greek poetry C8th or C7th BC)
 Pseudo-Apollodorus, The Library 3. 10. 1 (trans. Frazer) (Greek mythography C2nd AD)
 Scholiast on Pseudo-Apollodorus, The Library 3. 10. 1 (Apollodorus, The Library trans. Frazer 1921 Vol 2 p. 4)
 Pseudo-Apollodorus, The Library 3. 12. 5 (trans. Frazer) (Greek mythography C2nd AD)
 Pseudo-Hyginus, Fabulae 84 (trans. Grant) (Roman mythography C2nd AD)
 Pseudo-Hyginus, Fabulae 97
 Stephanus Byzantium, s.v. Akragantes (ed. Meinekii) (Byzantinian mythography C6AD)
 Scholiast on Stephanus Byzantium, s.v. Akragantes (A Dictionary of Greek and Roman Biography and Mythology ed. Smith 1870 Vol 1 p. 11)

Notes

References 

 Apollodorus, The Library with an English Translation by Sir James George Frazer, F.B.A., F.R.S. in 2 Volumes, Cambridge, MA, Harvard University Press; London, William Heinemann Ltd. 1921. ISBN 0-674-99135-4. Online version at the Perseus Digital Library. Greek text available from the same website.
Bell, Robert E., Women of Classical Mythology: A Biographical Dictionary. ABC-Clio. 1991. .
Gaius Julius Hyginus, Fabulae from The Myths of Hyginus translated and edited by Mary Grant. University of Kansas Publications in Humanistic Studies. Online version at the Topos Text Project.
 The Orphic Argonautica, translated by Jason Colavito. © Copyright 2011. Online version at the Topos Text Project.
Publius Ovidius Naso, Metamorphoses translated by Brookes More (1859-1942). Boston, Cornhill Publishing Co. 1922. Online version at the Perseus Digital Library.
 Publius Ovidius Naso, Metamorphoses. Hugo Magnus. Gotha (Germany). Friedr. Andr. Perthes. 1892. Latin text available at the Perseus Digital Library.
 Stephanus of Byzantium, Stephani Byzantii Ethnicorum quae supersunt, edited by August Meineike (1790-1870), published 1849. A few entries from this important ancient handbook of place names have been translated by Brady Kiesling. Online version at the Topos Text Project.
 Tzetzes, John, Allegories of the Iliad translated by Goldwyn, Adam J. and Kokkini, Dimitra. Dumbarton Oaks Medieval Library, Harvard University Press, 2015. 

Oceanids
Children of Potamoi
Boeotian characters in Greek mythology
Divine women of Zeus
Women of Helios